Coldspring-Oakhurst Consolidated Independent School District is a public school district based in Coldspring, Texas (USA).

In addition to Coldspring, the district also serves the cities of Oakhurst and Point Blank.

In 2009, the school district was rated "academically acceptable" by the Texas Education Agency.

Schools
Coldspring-Oakhurst High School (Grades 9-12)
Lincoln Junior High (Grades 6-8)
Coldspring-Oakhurst Intermediate (Grades 3-5)
Street Elementary (Grades PK-2)

References

External links

Coldspring-Oakhurst Consolidated ISD

School districts in San Jacinto County, Texas